Krobielewko  (German: Klein Krebbel) is a village in the administrative district of Gmina Skwierzyna, within Międzyrzecz County, Lubusz Voivodeship, in western Poland.

The village has a population of 160.

Gallery

References

Krobielewko